Ooievaarsnest is a neighborhood in Eindhoven, Netherlands. It is separated from Veldhoven only by the A2 motorway.

The name of the neighborhood literally means "stork's nest". The neighborhood was named after a 15th-century farm that was located within the area. This farm was torn down around 1970 to make way for new housing, after which housing construction commenced around 1975. Construction started with the Ontginningsweg (litt. Land reclamation road), which was originally laid as a service road for construction vehicles, and moved outward from there in two directions.

Houses in the area were built as purchased housing from the start (i.e. no rental housing was ever planned or zoned) and the neighborhood was planned to be a mixture of housing intended for middle class and higher income families. As a rule of thumb property sizes and pricing increase from north to south in the neighborhood, with somewhat smaller row houses in Elswout (on the northern end), through somewhat larger row houses and gardens around the Twickel and Warmelo, through to small villas on Herinkhave and Hunenborg (which are also nominally on the waterfront of the local ponds). As of 2010, the average value of neighborhood houses for tax purposes (the WOZ-waarde) is €464,000 .

The neighborhood association, known as the "Wijkvereniging het Ooievaarsnest", regularly organizes neighborhood festivities and events for children. It has also represented the neighborhood in matters pertaining to the expansion of the motorway, improvement of the sewers and improvement of rainwater drainage capacity (a long-standing neighborhood problem due to bad land preparation, as a result of hasty building in the 1970s).

References
Wijk Oud Kasteel, eindhoven.nl
Eindhoven Buurtmonitor, statistical data from the Eindhoven municipality

Neighbourhoods of Eindhoven